The 2019–20 Southampton F.C. season was the club's 21st season in the Premier League and their 43rd in the top division of English football. In addition to the Premier League, the club also competed in the FA Cup and the EFL Cup.

Pre-season

Competitions

Premier League

League table

Results summary

Results by matchday

Match results
On 13 June 2019, the Premier League fixtures were announced.

FA Cup

The third round draw was made live on BBC Two from Etihad Stadium, Micah Richards and Tony Adams conducted the draw. On 6 January, Alex Scott and David O'Leary conducted the fourth round draw live on BBC One from the Emirates Stadium.

EFL Cup

The second round draw was made on 13 August 2019 following the conclusion of all but one first round matches. The third round draw was confirmed on 28 August 2019, live on Sky Sports. The draw for the fourth round was made on 25 September 2019.

Squad statistics

Most appearances

Top goalscorers

Transfers
Players transferred in

Players loaned in

Players transferred out

Players loaned out

Players released

References

External links
Southampton F.C. official website

Southampton F.C. seasons
Southampton